Carlos Damián Rodríguez (born 13 January 1972) is an Argentinean musician, artist and songwriter, famous as part of the hardcore punk band Fun People and who is currently in the band Boom Boom Kid.  Also known by various aliases as: Nekro, Boom Boom Kid, and Il Carlo. He has released several CDs, DVDs, records and books.

Biography 
Born in Campana, Argentina, he has been a vegetarian since the age 17. His first concert was on 26 July 1989. In 1995, he released the record Anestesia and went on tour with the band Fun People, made up by Carlos Rodríguez (vocals), Lucas Elizald Sequeira (guitar), Dario López (bass), Marcelo Vidal (drums). His works are translated into Spanish and English, and in many cases both interchangeably. He also performs acoustic solo shows playing the guitar.

Highlights of his covers of other artists are: "Stay Free" from The Clash and the song "Principe Azul" (Blue Prince) from Uruguayan Eduardo Mateo.

On his arm he has a tattoo of the Saint Exupery character The Little Prince.

He has released his records in Latin América, Europe, Japan and USA, among others. In his shows, tours, and liner notes to these records, he conducts himself with a do it yourself ideology.

He appears in many of his videos. In the song "Brick by Brick" holding a sign with the legend: "Fuck art! let's rock", or singing in "I do" which was retransmitted by the MTV and the song "I don't mind" transmitted by MuchMusic.

Discography 

 1995, Fun People, Anesthesia
 1996, Fun People, Kum Kum
 1997, Fun People, Todo niño sensible sabrá de qué estamos hablando
 1998, Fun People, The Fun People Experience
 1999, Fun People, The Art(e) of Romance.
 1999, Fun People, Gori & Nekro – Golden hits
 2000, Fun People, Angustia no, no
 2001, Boom Boom Kid, Okey Dokey
  2004, Boom Boom Kid, Smiles from Chapanoland
 2006, Boom Boom Kid, The many many moods of Boom Boom Kid.
 2007, Boom Boom Kid, Wasabi
 2007, Boom Boom Kid, Espontáneos Momentos De 2x2 Es 16 Odas Al Dada Tunes
  2009, Boom Boom Kid, Frisbee
  2010, Boom Boom Kid, Colección verano 2010
  2011, Boom Boom Kid, Muy Frisbee
  2012, Boom Boom Kid, Libro absurdo
On 8 October 2011, he was invited to play with the band Bad Religion.

Collaborations 
In 2020 collaborated as a vocalist in the song "I'm Nothing" by Argentine/Australian musician Damián Gaume together with bassist Chris Chaney.

In 2014 was featured as a vocalist in the song "Si, es verdad" by Poncho.

References

External links

 Carlos Rodríguez – boom boom kid Myspace, official.

1972 births
Living people
Argentine male singer-songwriters
Spanish male writers
21st-century Argentine male  singers